CAcert.org is a community-driven certificate authority that issues free X.509 public key certificates. CAcert.org heavily relies on automation and therefore issues only Domain-validated certificates (and not Extended validation or Organization Validation certificates).

These certificates can be used to digitally sign and encrypt email, code, and documents, and to authenticate and authorize user connections to websites via TLS/SSL.

CAcert Inc. Association 
On 24 July 2003, Duane Groth incorporated CAcert Inc. as a non-profit association registered in New South Wales, Australia. CAcert Inc runs CAcert.org—a community-driven certificate authority.

In 2004, the Dutch Internet pioneer Teus Hagen became involved. He served as board member and, in 2008, as president.

Certificate Trust status 
A disadvantage of CAcert.org is that its root certificates are not included in the most widely deployed certificate stores and it has to be added by its customers. As of 2021, most browsers, email clients, and operating systems do not automatically trust certificates issued by CAcert. Thus, users receive an "untrusted certificate" warning upon trying to view a website providing X.509 certificate issued by CAcert, or view emails authenticated with CAcert certificates in Microsoft Outlook, Mozilla Thunderbird, etc. CAcert uses its own certificate on its website.

Web browsers 

Discussion for inclusion of CAcert root certificate in Mozilla Application Suite and Mozilla Firefox started in 2004. Mozilla had no CA certificate policy at the time. Eventually, Mozilla developed a policy which required CAcert to improve their management system and conduct audits. In April 2007, CAcert formally withdrew its application for inclusion in the Mozilla root program. At the same time, the CA/Browser Forum was established to facilitate communication among browser vendors and Certificate Authorities. Mozilla's advice was incorporated into "Baseline Requirements" used by most major browser vendors. Progress toward meeting Mozilla and "Baseline Requirements" requirements and a new request for inclusion can hardly be expected in the near future.

Operating systems 
FreeBSD included CAcert's root certificate but removed it in 2008, following Mozilla's policy. In 2014, CAcert was removed from Ubuntu, Debian, and OpenBSD root stores. In 2018, CAcert was removed from Arch Linux.

As of Feb 2022, the following operating systems or distributions include the CAcert root certificate by default:
 Arch Linux
 FreeWRT
 Gentoo (app-misc/ca-certificates only when USE flag cacert is set, defaults OFF from version 20161102.3.27.2-r2 )
 GRML
 Knoppix
 Mandriva Linux
 MirOS BSD
 Openfire
 Privatix
 Replicant (Android)
As of 2021, the following operating systems or distributions have an optional package with the CAcert root certificate:
 Debian
 openSUSE

Web of trust 

To create higher-trust certificates, users can participate in a web of trust system whereby users physically meet and verify each other's identities.  CAcert maintains the number of assurance points for each account. Assurance points can be gained through various means, primarily by having one's identity physically verified by users classified as "Assurers".

Having more assurance points allows users more privileges such as writing a name in the certificate and longer expiration times on certificates. A user with at least 100 assurance points is a Prospective Assurer, and may—after passing an Assurer Challenge—verify other users; more assurance points allow the Assurer to assign more assurance points to others.

CAcert sponsors key signing parties, especially at big events such as CeBIT and FOSDEM.

As of 2021, CAcert's web of trust has over 380,000 verified users.

Root certificate descriptions 
Since October 2005, CAcert offers Class 1 and Class 3 root certificates. Class 3 is a high-security subset of Class 1.

See also 
 Let's Encrypt
CAcert wiki

Further reading

References 

Cryptography organizations
Certificate authorities
Transport_Layer_Security
Information privacy
Safety_engineering